Intu Properties plc was a British real estate investment trust (REIT), largely focused on shopping centre management and development. Originally named Liberty International plc, it changed its name in May 2010 to Capital Shopping Centres Group plc after demerging its Capital & Counties Properties business unit to form an independent business. The company adopted the Intu name on 18 February 2013, and this was followed by the rebranding of most of its shopping centres under the Intu title from May 2013.

The company's shares were listed on the London and Johannesburg stock exchanges until it entered administration in June 2020. The company owned or part-owned 17 shopping centres in the UK and one in Spain prior to entering administration.

History

The company was established by Sir Donald Gordon in 1980 under the name Transatlantic Insurance Holdings plc as an offshoot of Liberty Life Association of Africa, a business he had founded in 1957. The company developed into a leading investor in life assurance businesses in the 1980s and divested its remaining life assurance interests (a 29% holding in Sun Life) in 1991. In 1992 it merged with Capital & Counties, a leading shopping centre developer, so securing itself a listing on the London Stock Exchange. It changed its name to Liberty International in 1996 and, after demerging Capital & Counties Properties in May 2010, renamed itself Capital Shopping Centres Group (CSC).

The company also disposed of a significant holding in its Californian subsidiary Capital and Counties USA, which was acquired by Equity One in May 2010. Equity One was later acquired by Regency Centers Corporation.

In 2011, CSC purchased the Trafford Centre from The Peel Group and offered a 20% stake in CSC to Peel chairman John Whittaker. The 20% stake in CSC was worth approximately £700m at the time, valuing the Trafford Centre at approximately £1.65 billion. Whittaker continued to purchase shares after the takeover and became the largest shareholder in 2012, with a stake of 24.63%.

CSC purchased the Westfield Group's 75% stake in Westfield Broadmarsh in Nottingham in November 2011.

Rebrand as Intu
In January 2013, CSC announced its rebranding as Intu and the renaming of twelve of its shopping centres to incorporate the new consumer-facing brand. A new orange and black brand identity was introduced at the same time, including a bird logo said to represent a "symbol of joy". At the same time and in response to changing consumer behaviour, Intu launched the UK's first online shopping centre and insourced all shopping centre staff, previously employed by facilities management company Bilfinger Europa.

2013 to 2019 
The company announced on 27 February 2013 that it had agreed to purchase Midsummer Place in Milton Keynes (now Intu Milton Keynes) from Legal & General for £250.5 million. The sale was completed by the end of March 2013.

In March 2014, Intu announced that it had purchased the Merry Hill Shopping Centre and Westfield Derby for a £867.8m property deal that saw Intu take complete ownership of Westfield's Derby shopping centre and Sprucefield Park in Northern Ireland.

In December 2017, the company agreed to a takeover by property development company Hammerson for £3.4 billion, subject to shareholder approval. In April 2018, Hammerson recommended that its shareholders reject the proposed takeover. With Intu hit by declining footfall on the high street and failures among major retailers, Peel Group, Olayan Group, and Brookfield Property launched a £2.8bn takeover bid in October, but, after due diligence procedures, they withdrew the offer in November 2018.

In November 2019, Intu said it was in talks to sell three Spanish shopping centres: Puerto Venecia in Zaragoza, intu Asturias in Oviedo, and intu Xanadu in Madrid. In December 2019, it sold its share in the Zaragoza asset for €237.7 million, delivering net proceeds of around €115m. The following month it sold its Oviedo asset, raising around €85 million.

2020 demise 
In March 2020, Intu abandoned a £1.3 billion emergency cash call as not enough investors were willing to support the call. The company had £4.5 billion of debt. The company subsequently warned that it could collapse if unable to raise further funds, after reporting a loss of £2bn for 2019. Intu shares had lost almost 90% of their value in a year, and the results announcement prompted a 25% drop to just over 4p. On 26 March, as the COVID-19 pandemic prompted more retailers to delay rent payments to Intu, the company warned that it would need some waivers from its lenders and was likely to breach its debt covenants in July; its shares fell 11% to 3.6p in the first hour of trading following the warning. On 23 June 2020, the company warned that shopping centres might close if financial restructuring talks with lenders failed, and lined up KPMG as administrators as a "contingency". On 26 June, Intu went into administration.

Intu SGS, a subsidiary of Intu and holding company for Intu Watford, Braehead, Victoria Centre and Lakeside, received funding in August 2020 to take full control of the four centres. The transfer from Intu to Intu SGS was expected to take place by the end of 2020, and to involve Global Mutual becoming asset manager of the centres and Savills serving as property manager. In September 2020, the transfers of Intu Derby, Merry Hill, and Milton Keynes to new owners were confirmed. Intu announced that Chapelfield would also be transferred to new owners, although these were not identified.

Properties

As of 31 December 2019 the company's investment properties were valued at £5.9 billion, when Intu owned or part-owned 17 shopping centres in the UK:

References

External links
 Official website 

2020 disestablishments in England
British companies disestablished in 2020
Companies based in London
Companies listed on the Johannesburg Stock Exchange
Companies that have entered administration in the United Kingdom
Real estate investment trusts of the United Kingdom
Financial services companies established in 1980
Shopping centres in the United Kingdom
Shopping center management firms